Evan Vucci (born 1977) is an American photographer. He works for Associated Press (AP) and is based in Washington, D.C. Vucci shoots and produces both still photography, and video projects, worldwide, on various subjects such as Washington, D.C. based sports, the U.S. military, and former President George W. Bush.

Vucci is also a motivational speaker.

Early life and education

Vucci was born in Olney, Maryland, growing up his mother was a secretary and his father a police officer. Vucci enrolled at Rochester Institute of Technology in 1995 on a path to commercial photography. Whilst there he attended a lecture given by photojournalist Michael Williamson. In the lecture, Williamson showed his work and spoke of his travels all around the world while on staff with The Washington Post. Vucci was struck by the photographs and life Williamson had lived and changed his major to focus on photojournalism. While still enrolled at Rochester Institute of Technology Vucci photographed sports for Reuters.

Life and work

After graduating from Rochester Institute of Technology in 2000 Vucci moved to Fayetteville, North Carolina and took a 30-hour-a-week position at the Fayetteville Observer. After about 3 months Vucci realized that life at a small-town paper was not for him. Vucci took a job in Sydney, Australia to work for the International Olympic Committee as a photo manager during the 2000 Summer Olympics. While working in Sydney, Vucci met then Associated Press photographer Doug Mills who would help him get his foot in the door at the AP as a freelance photojournalist.

Vucci is a graduate of the Rochester Institute of Technology.

In late 2003, Vucci accepted a position at the Associated Press, where he currently still works. One of Vucci’s most iconic shots came from Iraq while he was working for AP. On Sunday, December 14, 2008 Vucci was in a press conference with then-President George W. Bush in Baghdad. The joint press conference was to announce the signing of a status of forces agreement, which allowed US troops to remain in Iraq. During the press conference, Iraqi journalist Muntadhar al-Zaidi threw a shoe at then-President Bush.

In 2008, Vucci made several visits to Forward Operating Base Marez in Mosul, Iraq profiling soldiers and their stories. His primary focus was a Cavalry Scout Platoon from Killer Troop, 3d Squadron, 3d Armored Cavalry Regiment (3 ACR). He spent several weeks embedded with the platoon filming their patrols and lives spent at a Combat Outpost in Western Mosul. Many of those soldiers were wounded and three were killed.

He is working on a retrospective book called Power.DC.com that will include photography from Washington, D.C..

Vucci is also a motivational speaker. He uses the saying "Live life out of the Box, there is time for that when you're dead when you're put into a box forever."

References

Living people
1977 births
American photojournalists
Associated Press photographers